John Mackle (15 August 1953 – 27 June 2010) was a New Zealand cricketer. He played in ten first-class and two List A matches for Canterbury from 1980 to 1982.

See also
 List of Canterbury representative cricketers

References

External links
 

1953 births
2010 deaths
New Zealand cricketers
Canterbury cricketers
People from Temuka
Cricketers from Canterbury, New Zealand